The 2022–23 Dream11 Super Smash was the sixteenth season of the women's Super Smash Twenty20 cricket competition played in New Zealand. It took place between 23 December 2022 and 11 February 2023, with 6 provincial teams taking part. Wellington Blaze were the defending champions.

The tournament ran alongside the 2022–23 Hallyburton Johnstone Shield.

Canterbury Magicians won the tournament after beating Wellington Blaze in the final, winning their sixth title.

Competition format
Teams played in a double round-robin in a group of six, therefore playing 10 matches overall. Matches were played using a Twenty20 format. The top team in the group advanced straight to the final, whilst the second and third placed teams played off in an elimination final.

The group worked on a points system with positions being based on the total points. Points were awarded as follows:

Win: 4 points 
Tie: 2 points 
Loss: 0 points.
Abandoned/No Result: 2 points.

Points table

 advanced to Grand Final
 advanced to Elimination Final

Fixtures

Round-robin

Finals

Statistics

Most runs

Source: ESPN Cricinfo

Most wickets

Source: ESPN Cricinfo

References

External links
 Series home at ESPN Cricinfo

Super Smash (cricket)
2022–23 New Zealand cricket season
Super Smash (women's cricket)